B-39 was a Project 641 diesel-electric attack submarine of the Soviet Navy. The "B" (actually "Б") in her designation stands for большая (bolshaya, "large")—Foxtrots were the Soviet Navy's largest non-nuclear submarines. In 2005 B-39 became a museum ship on display at the Maritime Museum of San Diego, California, United States. In October 2021 the decision was made to withdraw the deteriorating submarine from the collection and scrap it.

Service history
Her keel was laid down on 9 February 1962 at the Admiralty Shipyard in Leningrad (now known as Saint Petersburg). She was launched on 15 April 1967 and commissioned on 28 December 1967.

Transferred to the 9th Submarine Squadron of the Pacific Fleet, B-39 was homeported in Vladivostok. She conducted patrols and stalked U.S. warships throughout the North Pacific, along the coast of the United States and Canada, and ranging as far as the Indian Ocean and the Arctic Ocean. After the end of the Vietnam War, she often made port visits to Danang. During the early 1970s, B-39 trailed a Canadian frigate through Strait of Juan de Fuca to Vancouver Island.

Both crews took pictures of each other.

Post-USSR history
B-39 was decommissioned on 1 April 1994 and sold to Finland. She made her way from there through a series of sales to Vancouver Island in 1996 and to Seattle, Washington, in 2002 before arriving in San Diego, California, on 22 April 2005 and becoming an exhibit of the Maritime Museum of San Diego. During her sequence of owners she acquired the names "Black Widow" and "Cobra", neither of which she had during her commissioned career.

When B-39 was made a museum, the shroud around her attack periscope was cut away where it passes through her control room. As built, a Foxtrot's periscopes are only accessible from her conning tower, which is off-limits in the museum. However, the unidentified and unexplained change gives the false impression that one periscope could be used from the control room.

In 2000, while stored in Vancouver, B-39 was used as a stage for scenes in the Stargate SG-1 episode "Small Victories". In 2012 she was a stage for the movie Phantom.

In 2010 B-39 was proposed to be sunk to create an offshore diving reef, but an outcry from teachers and enthusiasts ensured the sub would stay on display for the time being.

During the 2000s B-39 became badly rusted with large holes visible in the outer hull and upper deck. In October 2021 the museum decided to withdraw the submarine from its collection. On 
February 7, 2022 she headed out to Ensenada, Mexico to be scrapped.

See also 
 B-427, a Foxtrot on display in Long Beach, California
 Submarine U-475 "Black Widow", a Foxtrot class awaiting restoration on the River Medway, England

References

External links

 Submarine B-39
 B-39 Project 641, serial number 210 (in Russian)
 B-39 at the Maritime Museum of San Diego
  Soviet B-39 at Historic Naval Ships Association

Maritime Museum of San Diego
Foxtrot-class submarines
Ships built in the Soviet Union
1967 ships
Cold War submarines of the Soviet Union
Museum ships in San Diego
Military and war museums in California
Museum ships in California